The Z Channel was one of the first pay television stations in the United States best known for its devotion to the art of cinema due to the eclectic choice of films  by the programming chief, Jerry Harvey.

History
Z Channel was launched in 1974 by Theta Cable  (a division of TelePrompTer Corporation and Hughes Aircraft Co.) which was acquired by Group W (Westinghouse) in 1981. Operations were located in Santa Monica, California. Jerry Harvey was hired as program director in 1980. As program director, Harvey was given permission to program the network the way he saw fit. As such, the network featured a wide variety of films not typically shown on other pay television services at the time.

These included many B movies, silent films, foreign films, and original unedited versions of films. 
On Christmas Eve 1982, Harvey made the decision to show the original (previously unreleased in two years) version of Heaven's Gate, a movie that had been considered a disaster by all accounts. His decision was a success as the movie became the most watched feature ever shown on Z Channel. Other networks soon followed and aired Heaven's Gate.

By the mid-1980s, Z Channel had 90,000 subscribers. In 1987, Group W sold Z Channel to Seattle-based Rock Associates for $5 million. Both increased competition and lack of interest by Group W leading up to the sale led to a decrease in subscribers. In January 1988, Rock Associates merged with American Spectacor.

Demise
In April 1988, there were two major changes to the network: the death of Jerry Harvey and the addition of sports to regular programming. (It had broadcast a UCLA–USC basketball game around 1978.) Deals were made to show games from the Los Angeles Angels, Clippers and Dodgers. This increased the numbers of subscribers to 110,000. The sports deals were funded by selling advertising during the games. However, a lawsuit ensued with a court ruling that contracts with the movie studios stipulated that the service be commercial-free.

Out of options, the channel was sold to Cablevision and NBC on March 16, 1989, who were partners in the joint-venture SportsChannel and set to launch Consumer News and Business Channel (now CNBC). On June 29, 1989, Z Channel faded to black and was replaced by SportsChannel Los Angeles. The last film shown on Z Channel was the John Ford film My Darling Clementine.

Legacy
Z Channel popularized the use of letterboxing on television, as well as showing "director's cut" versions of films (which is a term popularized after Z Channel's showing of Heaven's Gate). Z Channel's devotion to cinema and choice of rare and important films had an influence on such directors as Robert Altman, Quentin Tarantino, and Jim Jarmusch.

The channel was the subject of the 2004 documentary Z Channel: A Magnificent Obsession, which was directed by Alexandra Cassavetes, daughter of John Cassavetes.

Selected films that aired on Z Channel

1900
48 Hrs.
A Clockwork Orange
A Touch of Class
Airplane!
Airport 1975
Alice Doesn't Live Here Anymore
All That Jazz
American Graffiti
...And Justice for All
Apocalypse Now
At Long Last Love
Beverly Hills Cop
Black Christmas
Black Orpheus
Blazing Saddles
The Blue Lagoon
The Blues Brothers
Das Boot
Bring Me the Head of Alfredo Garcia
Caddyshack
California Suite
Candleshoe
Chan Is Missing
The Charge of the Light Brigade
The China Syndrome
City Lights
Coal Miner's Daughter
Corvette Summer
Crocodile Dundee
The Dark Crystal
Death Race 2000
Desperately Seeking Susan
Diva
Dressed to Kill
Electra Glide in Blue
The Electric Horseman
Eyes of Laura Mars
Fatso
Fiddler on the Roof
Freebie and the Bean
The Front
The Front Page
The Goodbye Girl
The Great American Cowboy
The Great Gatsby
The Great Santini
Harry and Tonto
Heaven's Gate
How I Won the War
I Vitelloni
Ikuru
It's Alive
Jesus Christ Superstar
Johnny Guitar
Julia
The Last Starfighter
The Leopard
Let It Be
Los Olvidados
Love and Death
MacArthur
Magnum Force
The Man Who Fell to Earth
McCabe and Mrs. Miller
Midnight Cowboy
The Mission
My Darling Clementine
National Lampoon's Vacation
North Dallas Forty
On Golden Pond
Once Upon A Time in America
One on One
The Onion Field
Ordinary People
Overlord
The Parallax View
Pat Garrett and Billy The Kid
Paths of Glory
Prince of the City
The Prisoner of Second Avenue
Private Benjamin
Rear Window
Ride the High Country
Rocky
Running Scared
Salvador
Same Time, Next Year
Scarecrow
The Seduction of Mimi
Silver Streak
Something for Everyone
Somewhere in Time
The Song Remains the Same
The Spider's Stratagem
A Star is Born (1937)
A Star is Born (1976)
Stardust Memories
The Sting
The Story of Adele H
Straw Dogs
The Super Cops
That Most Important Thing: Love
The Wind and the Lion
The Yakuza
Thieves Like Us
Throne of Blood
Thunderbolt and Lightfoot
Time Bandits
The Turning Point
An Unmarried Woman
Valentino
Vertigo
Videodrome
Weird Science
Westworld
Whose Life Is It Anyway
The Wild Bunch

See also
The Criterion Collection, similar in content
Home Box Office, one of Z's competitors
Showtime, also one of the competitors

References 

Sports in Los Angeles
Television channels and stations established in 1974
Television channels and stations disestablished in 1989
American subscription television services
Film preservation
Defunct television networks in the United States
Film and video fandom
TelePrompTer Corporation